Portugal was represented by António Calvário, with the song "Oração", at the 1964 Eurovision Song Contest, which took place on 21 March in Copenhagen. "Oração" was chosen as the Portuguese entry at the Grande Prémio TV da Canção Portuguesa on 2 February. This was Portugal's debut at the event and consequently the first time that the Portuguese language was heard at the contest.

Before Eurovision

Festival da Canção 1964
The Grande Prémio TV da Canção Portuguesa 1964 was held on 2 February 1964 at 22:25 UTC at the Lumiar studios of the Radio and Television of Portugal in Lisbon, hosted by Maria Helena Fialho Gouveia and Henrique Mendes. Twelve songs took part in the final and each artist sung two songs. Armando Tavares Belo conducted all the songs. The winning song was chosen by a distrital jury, composed by three members, each had 5 votes to be distributed among the songs it intended to award, making a total of 15 votes per district.

At Eurovision 
On the night of the final Calvário performed 11th in the running order, following the Monaco and preceding Italy. Only an audio recording of Calvário's performance survives, as the video master of the 1964 contest is believed to have been lost in a fire at the Danish TV archive during the 1970s, and no other broadcaster had kept a copy. Voting was by each national jury awarding 5-3-1 to their top 3 songs, and at the close "Oração" was one of four songs (along with the entries from Germany, Switzerland and Yugoslavia) which had failed to pick up a single point. This was the third consecutive contest in which four countries had failed to score, and a first time a country debuts with nul-points. The Portuguese jury awarded its 5 points to Italy. The orchestra during the Portuguese entry was conducted by Kai Mortensen.

Voting 
Portugal did not receive any points at the 1964 Eurovision Song Contest.

References 

1964
Countries in the Eurovision Song Contest 1964
Eurovision